Ctenopristis is a prehistoric genus of sawfish whose fossils are found in rocks dating from the Maastrichtian stage in Jordan. The anterior teeth of Ctenopristis have a high cusp compared to certain other ancient sawfish genera.

See also
 Flora and fauna of the Maastrichtian stage
 List of prehistoric cartilaginous fish (Chondrichthyes)

Prehistoric cartilaginous fish genera
Cretaceous cartilaginous fish
Late Cretaceous fish of Asia
Fossil taxa described in 1940